Dead of Winter is a BBC Books original novel written by James Goss and based on the long-running British science fiction television series Doctor Who. It features the Eleventh Doctor.

Characters
Eleventh Doctor
Amy Pond
Rory Williams
Maria
Dr. Bloom
Mr. Nevil
Perdita
Prince Boris
Kosov

Audiobook
An unabridged audiobook version of Dead Of Winter read by Clare Corbett, was released on 3 November 2011.

References 

2011 British novels
2011 science fiction novels
Eleventh Doctor novels